The Maraş massacre was the massacre of more than one hundred leftists and Alevi Kurds in the city of Kahramanmaraş, Turkey, in December 1978, primarily by the neo-fascist Grey Wolves. 

Martial law was declared after the massacre, but this did not halt a campaign of violence elsewhere including in cities like Çorum and Konya.

Background
The events in Kahramanmaraş lasted from 19 to 26 December 1978. It started with a bomb thrown into a cinema attended mostly by right-wingers. Rumors spread that left-wingers had thrown the bomb. The next day, a bomb was thrown into a coffee shop frequently visited by left-wingers. In the evening of 21 December 1978 the teachers Hacı Çolak and Mustafa Yüzbaşıoğlu, known as left-wingers, were killed on their way home. Their funeral was to take place the next day but armed clashes erupted outside the mosque where prayers were preventing the ceremony. By the end of the day, a total of three people were killed and property and workplaces were destroyed.

Massacre
Over the next five days, over a hundred people were killed, a majority being women and children who were killed in cold blood at home. Parts of Maraş were destroyed and a curfew was subsequently instated in the city. Neither the army nor the police attempted to stop the actions. On 23 December, crowds stormed the quarters where Alevis were living, attacking people and destroying houses and shops. Many offices, including that of the Confederation of Progressive Trade Unions of Turkey (DİSK), Teachers' Association of Turkey (TÖB-Der), Association of Police Officers (Pol-Der) and Republican People's Party (CHP), were destroyed. By 26 December, the city and situation was brought under control and the government put thirteen provinces in martial law. Most of the victims were from the small population of Kurdish Alevis in Sunni-populated areas in the city. The Alevis were migrants from Tunceli.

During the trial witnesses testified that victims were frequently asked by their assailants to prove that they were Muslim and Turkish.

Victims 
The figures on casualties vary slightly. The Independent Communication Network Bianet claim that 111 people were killed, while the daily Zaman puts the death toll at 105.

Aftermath 
Opinions of witnesses include the following observations:

 Seyho Demir: "The Maraş Police Chief at the time was Abdülkadir Aksu. The massacre was organised by the Turkish secret service MIT, the Nationalist Movement Party (MHP) and the Islamists together... As soon as I heard about the massacre, I went to Maraş. In the morning I went to Maraş  State Hospital. There, I met a nurse I knew... When she saw me, she was surprised: 'Seyho, where have you come from? They are killing everyone here. They have taken at least ten lightly-wounded people from the hospital downstairs and killed them.' This was done under the control of the head physician of the Maraş State Hospital. The lawyer Halil Güllüoglu followed the Maraş massacre case. The files he had were never made public. He was killed for pursuing the case anyway."

 Meryem Polat: "They started in the morning, burning all the houses, and continued into the afternoon. A child was burned in a boiler. They sacked everything. We were in the water in the cellar, above us were wooden boards. The boards were burning and falling on top of us. My house was reduced to ashes. We were with eight people in the cellar; they did not see us and left."

Trials 
The court cases, opened at military courts, lasted until 1991 when Anti Terror Law enacted. A total of 804 defendants were put on trial. The courts issued 29 death penalties and sentenced seven defendants to life imprisonment and 321 others to sentences between one and 24 years of imprisonment. All of the defendants were released by 1992 thanks to a law passed the previous year.

Potential perpetrators 
Hasan Fehmi Güneş, who was appointed Interior Minister after the incidents, is convinced that the massacre was planned. Ruşen Sümbüloğlu, chair of the "Association of Persons from 1968" in Ankara, claimed that the Counter-Guerrilla was behind the provocation. Fevzi Gümüş, chair of the "Cultural Association Pir Sultan Abdal" claimed that the CIA and the deep state must have been involved. Turan Eser, President of the "Alevi Bektaşi Federation", spoke at the 29th anniversary of the massacre in Maraş. He alleged that before the events,"counter guerrilla and racist paramilitary imperialist henchmen made efforts to spread the seeds of hatred between those, who were citizens of the same country and had lived together in peace for centuries".A secret document revealed that the secret service (MİT) had planned the incidents.

Ökkeş Şendiller, who had been on trial for being involved in the incident, later became a member of parliament, and was involved in the foundation of the Turkish nationalist Great Union Party (BBP). In 2007, the radio station Voice of Free Radio and Folk Songs broadcast a program, in which Ökkeş Şendiller was interviewed over the phone. Passages of the conversation with Hasan Harmancı are (only quotes from ÖŞ):
 "I was chosen as victim. I saw the most horrible torture. The teachers that were killed, were not Alevi. They were left-wing Sunnis. There were clashes, in which people of both sides were killed... I am talking about court documents. They say that the organization Revolutionary War threw the bomb."

On 30 April 2011, Hamit Kapan, an alleged member of Devrimci Savaş, who had been held incommunicado for 300 days while two friends of his were tortured to death, accused General Yusuf Haznedaroğlu, responsible for martial law in Kahramanmaraş, of being responsible for the torture.

References

Further reading 

 "Alevite Meeting for the Still Unresolved Maraş Massacre," 22 December 2008, Bianet News in English. Retrieved 2010-07-02.
 Martin Sökefeld. Struggling for Recognition: the Alevi Movement in Germany and in Transnational Space, Google Books, p. 51. Retrieved 2010-07-02.

See also 
 List of massacres in Turkey
 Sivas massacre
 1980 Turkish coup d'état
 Martial law and state of emergency in Turkey

Massacres of Kurds
Massacres in Turkish Kurdistan
Massacres in Turkey
Grey Wolves (organization) attacks
Turkish war crimes
Political violence in Turkey
1978 murders in Turkey
Massacres in 1978
Alevi massacres
Attacks on cinemas
Attacks on restaurants in Asia
December 1978 crimes
December 1978 events in Asia
Explosions in 1978
History of Kahramanmaraş
Building bombings in Turkey
Mass murder in 1978
Pogroms
Terrorist incidents in Turkey
Terrorist incidents in Turkey in 1978